In mathematics, the Meixner–Pollaczek polynomials are a family of orthogonal polynomials P(x,φ) introduced by , which up to elementary changes of variables are the same as the Pollaczek polynomials P(x,a,b) rediscovered by   in the case λ=1/2, and later generalized by him.

They are defined by

Examples

The first few Meixner–Pollaczek polynomials are

Properties

Orthogonality

The Meixner–Pollaczek polynomials Pm(λ)(x;φ) are orthogonal on the real line with respect to the weight function

and the orthogonality relation is given by

Recurrence relation

The sequence of Meixner–Pollaczek polynomials satisfies the recurrence relation

Rodrigues formula

The Meixner–Pollaczek polynomials are given by the Rodrigues-like formula

where w(x;λ,φ) is the weight function given above.

Generating function

The Meixner–Pollaczek polynomials have the generating function

See also

Sieved Pollaczek polynomials

References

Orthogonal polynomials